Nellie Evans Packard was a Welsh-born singer, voice teacher, arranger, and choir director based in Boston, Massachusetts.

Early life
Nellie Evans was born at Llanrug, the daughter of Thomas Evans, who worked at the Llanberis slate quarries. She studied voice in Wales and in London.

In Massachusetts
Nellie Evans moved to America in 1888, and married Frank Edward Packard, an insurance agent who was also a musician. The couple led the music program at Central Methodist Church in Brockton, Massachusetts; Nellie directed a 50-person choir, and Frank was the church's organist. She also taught voice at a studio in Boston.

In addition to presenting her students' recitals, Nellie Evans Packard was active in making community singing events popular in Brockton. "Mrs. Packard often conducts her largest audiences without any help except a good pianist, keeping up the interest for the hour and a half by judicious variety of program," a reporter found in 1918. She had "about a hundred guests" at her house for a "company sing-song" at Thanksgiving 1919.

Mrs. Packard was an arranger of church music, including a cantata titled Ruth, A Daughter of Moab, which she arranged for women's voices.

References

19th-century Welsh women singers
Welsh emigrants to the United States
19th-century American women singers
19th-century American singers
Musicians from Massachusetts